Priboieni is a commune in Argeș County, Muntenia, Romania. It is composed of eight villages: Albotele, Paraschivești, Priboieni, Sămăila, Pitoi, Valea Mare, Valea Nenii and Valea Popii.

References

Communes in Argeș County
Localities in Muntenia